Acacia kochii is a shrub belonging to the genus Acacia and the subgenus Phyllodineae.

Description
It has clusters of phyllodes found in the nodes. It produces yellow flowers in August. The simple inflorescences occur singly or in groups of two or three. The dull black seeds in the pods have an elliptic shape.

Distribution
It is native to an area in the Wheatbelt and Goldfields-Esperance regions of Western Australia between Yalgoo in the north to Moora in the south growing in clay or loamy-sandy soils.

See also
 List of Acacia species

References

kochii
Acacias of Western Australia
Plants described in 1911